The Arcticidae are a family of marine clams in the order Venerida. The only living species in the family is Arctica islandica. There are also many fossil species classified in a number of genera.

References

External links
https://www.researchgate.net/publication/309181676_Behavioral_responses_of_Arctica_islandica_Bivalvia_Arcticidae_to_simulated_leakages_of_carbon_dioxide_from_sub-sea_geological_storage

 
 DiscoverLife

 
Bivalve families

fr:Arcticidae